Nadia Krüger (born 30 June 1968) is a Swiss freestyle swimmer. She competed in two events at the 1984 Summer Olympics.

References

External links
 

1968 births
Living people
Swiss female freestyle swimmers
Olympic swimmers of Switzerland
Swimmers at the 1984 Summer Olympics
Place of birth missing (living people)
20th-century Swiss women